Christ Episcopal Church is a historic Episcopal church building at 206 South Locust Street in Bastrop, Louisiana.

The Gothic Revival style building was constructed in 1897 and added to the National Register of Historic Places on July 22, 1982.

It has a cruciform plan, and the main entrance is through a square tower set into one corner.  It has tall and narrow windows with triangular tops approximating pointed arches.  As of 1982 the church was well-preserved;  the only addition had been a c.1950 parish hall linked to the church by a covered walkway.

See also
National Register of Historic Places listings in Morehouse Parish, Louisiana

References

Episcopal church buildings in Louisiana
Churches on the National Register of Historic Places in Louisiana
Gothic Revival church buildings in Louisiana
Churches completed in 1897
Churches in Morehouse Parish, Louisiana
19th-century Episcopal church buildings
National Register of Historic Places in Morehouse Parish, Louisiana